Geikie Peak is a -elevation summit located in the Grand Canyon, in Coconino County of northern Arizona, United States. Access is via the Tonto Trail which traverses 270 degrees around the base of the peak. According to the Köppen climate classification system, Geikie Peak is located in a cold semi-arid climate zone.

History
George Wharton James named it "Geikie Monument" in 1901 for Sir Archibald Geikie (1835–1924), Director General of the Geological Survey of the United Kingdom, who studied geology in the Grand Canyon, finding evidence to support his theories of erosion. This feature's present name was officially adopted in 1908 by the U.S. Board on Geographic Names.

Geology
Geikie Peak is composed of Mississippian Redwall Limestone, with a small cupola of the basal layer of Pennsylvanian-Permian Supai Group on top. The cliff-forming Redwall overlays the Cambrian Tonto Group, and below that Paleoproterozoic Vishnu Basement Rocks at river level in Granite Gorge.

Scylla Butte

At the end of Geikie Peak's east spur lies a smaller feature called Scylla Butte. This feature is named for Scylla, a monster according to Greek mythology, in keeping with Clarence Dutton's practice of naming geographical features in the Grand Canyon after mythological deities. It rises approximately 400 feet above the Tonto Trail which nearly surrounds it. The first ascent of this butte was made by James Kirshvink and James Ohlman on March 18, 1978.

See also
 Geology of the Grand Canyon area

References

External links

 Weather forecast: National Weather Service
 Geikie pronunciation
 Aerial view, Geikie Peak, Mountainzone
 Scylla Butte
 Geikie Peak photo by Harvey Butchart

Grand Canyon
Landforms of Coconino County, Arizona
Colorado Plateau
Grand Canyon National Park
North American 1000 m summits
Grand Canyon, South Rim
Grand Canyon, South Rim (west)